The Islamabad Football Association (IFA) is the regional governing body of :association football and futsal in Islamabad, Pakistan. Its headquarters are located in Jinnah Sports Stadium. IFA is responsible for the organization and governance of football's major regional tournaments in Islamabad region including IFA 'A' and 'B' Division Leagues, the Jashan-i-Azadi Football Tournament, and the Islamabad Challenge Cup. It also organizes various Islamabad teams which participate in local and domestic tournaments.

As of December 2020, IFA has 42 football clubs as members.

IFA has been a permanent member of the Pakistan Football Federation Congress since 2010. It was then given membership for the term 2011-2015. In March 2011, it hosted a  PFF D-Certificate Football Coaching Course with the collaboration of PFF.

IFA Ranking Table

2011 IFA 'A' Division League Table

2011 IFA 'B' League Points Table

2011 IFA 'C' League Points Table

Gothia Cup 

In August 2017, the IFA U-18 team became the first team from Pakistan to win the Gothia Cup China U-18 event held in Shenyang.

Logo controversy 
Islamabad Football Association uploaded its new logo to its Facebook page in January 2012. However, in 2017, a Reddit user alleged that it was nearly identical to the logo used by Football Association of Ireland in terms of the design, colors, and the font. IFA then changed its logo next year.

References 

Sport in Islamabad
Football governing bodies in Pakistan